Houssam Eddine Ghacha (born 22 October 1995) is an Algerian professional footballer who plays as a winger for Süper Lig club Antalyaspor.

Club career
On 17 July 2018 Ghacha made his ES Sétif debut as a starter in the 2018 CAF Champions League group stage against Difaâ El Jadidi. Ghacha had an assist and scored the winning goal in the 89th minute to give Sétif the 2–1 victory.

On 22 July 2021, he joined Antalyaspor.

References

External links
 
 NFT Profile

1995 births
Living people
People from Biskra Province
Association football wingers
21st-century Algerian people
Algerian footballers
Algeria international footballers
Algerian Ligue Professionnelle 1 players
Algerian Ligue 2 players
Süper Lig players
Amal Bou Saâda players
ES Sétif players
USM Blida players
Antalyaspor footballers
Algerian expatriate footballers
Expatriate footballers in Turkey
Algerian expatriate sportspeople in Turkey